Parafollicular cells, also called C cells, are neuroendocrine cells in the thyroid. The primary function of these cells is to secrete calcitonin. They are located adjacent to the thyroid follicles and reside in the connective tissue. These cells are large and have a pale stain compared with the follicular cells. In teleost and avian species these cells occupy a structure outside the thyroid gland named the ultimobranchial body.

Structure 
Parafollicular cells are pale-staining cells found in small number in the thyroid and are typically situated basally in the epithelium, without direct contact with the follicular lumen. They are always situated within the basement membrane, which surrounds the entire follicle.

Development
Parafollicular cells are derived from pharyngeal endoderm. Embryologically, they associate with the ultimobranchial body, which is a ventral derivative of the fourth (or fifth) pharyngeal pouch. Parafollicular cells were previously believed to be derived from the neural crest based on a series of experiments in quail-chick chimeras. However, lineage tracing experiments in mice revealed that parafollicular cells are derived from the endoderm origin.

Function 
Parafollicular cells secrete calcitonin, a hormone that participates in the regulation of calcium metabolism. Calcitonin lowers blood levels of calcium by inhibiting the resorption of bone by osteoclasts, and its secretion is increased proportionally with the concentration of calcium.

Parafollicular cells are also known to secrete in smaller quantities several neuroendocrine peptides such as serotonin, somatostatin or CGRP.  They may also have a role in regulating thyroid hormones production locally, as they express thyrotropin-releasing hormone.

Clinical significance
When parafollicular cells become cancerous, they lead to medullary carcinoma of the thyroid.

See also 
List of human cell types derived from the germ layers

References

Further reading

External links 
 
 
  
 

Peptide hormone secreting cells
Human cells
Thyroid